Nikola Bogić (Serbian Cyrillic: Никола Богић; born 30 June 1981) is a Serbian professional footballer who plays as a midfielder for Budućnost Srpska Crnja.

Club career
Bogić started out at his hometown club Proleter Zrenjanin, but later moved to Mladost Apatin. He spent two seasons at the club, before switching to Hajduk Kula. In the following eight years, between 2003 and 2011, Bogić made over 200 league appearances for the club.

International career
Bogić represented FR Yugoslavia at under-21 level, appearing in a 1–2 friendly loss away against the Spain U21s in April 2002.

Statistics

References

External links
 Srbijafudbal profile
 
 
 

Association football midfielders
Expatriate footballers in Montenegro
First League of Serbia and Montenegro players
FK Banat Zrenjanin players
FK Hajduk Kula players
FK Mladost Apatin players
FK Mogren players
FK Proleter Zrenjanin players
FK Smederevo players
Montenegrin First League players
Serbia and Montenegro under-21 international footballers
Serbian expatriate footballers
Serbian expatriate sportspeople in Montenegro
Serbian First League players
Serbian footballers
Serbian SuperLiga players
Sportspeople from Zrenjanin
1981 births
Living people